Racine Nunatak is a nunatak, 960 m, located 3 nautical miles (6 km) west of the lower part of Reedy Glacier and 7 nautical miles (13 km) east-southeast of Berry Peaks. Mapped by United States Geological Survey (USGS) from ground surveys and U.S. Navy air photos, 1960–63. Named by Advisory Committee on Antarctic Names (US-ACAN) for Edward J. Racine, a member of the crew of the icebreaker Eastwind in Operation Deep Freeze 1967.

Nunataks of Marie Byrd Land